Ujaan Ganguly is an Indian film and theatre actor. He made his debut in Rosogolla (2018) directed by Pavel and was named as one of the top 10 actors of 2019. He was also adjudged the Best Debut Actor at the Tele Cine Awards and the North American Bengali Conference Film Festival, at Baltimore, 2019.

Personal life 
Ujaan is the son of film director Kaushik Ganguly and actress Churni Ganguly. He studied English literature at Jadavpur University.

Education 

At St. James' School he was invested as the School Captain. In his 12th Standard, Ujaan represented India at the Modern World Debate hosted at Dubai Modern High School. For his academic performance of 98.25% in Arts he was awarded the Bishop of Calcutta Gold Medal for Academic Excellence in ISC. He also received the honour of Times of India Student of the Year and the prestigious Kalyan Bharti Trust Award for All-Round Excellence at The Telegraph School Awards 2016.

Ujaan is also a Gold Medalist student. He is the recipient of a first class A+ grade Bachelor's degree from Jadavpur University with distinction in English and was awarded the Gold Medal and the Best All-Rounder Graduate and Student of the Year of Jadavpur University in 2019.  He is now all set to pursue his masters' degree at the University of Oxford in World Literatures with the Ertegun Graduate Scholarship as a member of St Hugh's college.

Career 
Ujaan Ganguly acted in a musical Smike in 2013 and played the role of a 50-year old school head-master. He made his debut in the big screen in Rosogolla (2018) directed by Pavel. In the film he played the role of Nobin Chandra Das, the creator of Rosogolla. Later, he worked as an assistant director in the National Award winning Nagarkirtan. In 2019, he acted in Lokkhi Chele directed by his UNESCO Fellini awardee filmmaker Kaushik Ganguly. The film was produced by Nandita Roy and Shiboprosad Mukherjee. After Rosogolla Ganguly played the lead role in this film as well. His character in this film was of Amir Hussain, a young doctor in Purulia district, India. Ganguly commented on his character in this film: "My role is that of a simple lokkhi chhele. I'm playing this character called Amir Hussain; he’s a young doctor. And his moral compass is very different from the rest of us, most of us. And he has certain views of life which are distinctly different from other people and yet shape the film in a very important way." The film release was delayed due to the COVID-19 pandemic.

Filmography

References

External links 
 

Living people
Jadavpur University alumni
Male actors in Bengali cinema
Male actors from Kolkata
Year of birth missing (living people)